is a Japanese motorcycle racer. In 2016 he competes aboard a Honda NSF250R in the MFJ All Japan Road Race J-GP3 Championship.

Career statistics

Grand Prix motorcycle racing

By season

Races by year

References

External links

2000 births
Living people
Japanese motorcycle racers
Moto3 World Championship riders